Awl may refer to:

Tools

 Bradawl, a woodworking hand tool for making small holes
 Scratch awl, a woodworking layout and point-making tool used to scribe a line 
 Stitching awl, a tool for piercing holes in a variety of materials such as leather or canvases

Biology
 Butterfly species called "awl", of the family Hesperiidae
Awls, genus Hasora
 Awl-flies, family Xylophagidae
Awl nematode, or genus Dolichodorus

People
Aime M. Awl (1887–1973), American scientific illustrator
Farah Awl (1937–1991), Somali writer
William Maclay Awl (1799–1876), American psychiatrist and politician

Other uses
 AA-4 'Awl', the NATO reporting name for the Raduga K-9 air-to-air missile 
 Academic Word List, a word frequency list from a broad range of academic texts
 Alliance for Workers' Liberty, a Trotskyist group in Britain
 Arizona Winter League, a former instructional baseball league
 The Awl, a current events and culture website in New York City
 Statement List (German: Anweisungsliste (AWL)), an instruction list language of Siemens
 Alas Nacionales, a former airline, ICAO airline code AWL

See also

 Owl (disambiguation)
 Aul, a type of fortified village found throughout the Caucasus mountains and Central Asia
 Ahlspiess or awl pike, a 15th–16th century thrusting spear